Dubove may refer to:

Populated places

Ukraine
There are at least 15 populated places that carry such name.
 Dubove, Tiachiv Raion, an urban-type settlement in Zakarpattia Oblast of western Ukraine
 Dubove, Chernivtsi Oblast, a village in Mikhalcha Commune, Chernivtsi Raion, Chernivtsi Oblast, Ukraine
 Dubove, Shakhtarsk municipality, a rural settlement in Shakhtarsk, Ukraine
 Komsomolskyi, renamed by Ukrainian authorities Dubove, an urban-type settlement in Luhansk Oblast

Slovakia
 Dubové, Turčianske Teplice District, Slovakia
 Dubové, Zvolen District, Slovakia

See also
 Dubovoe, similar name for populated places in Russia
 Dubovae, similar name for populated places in Belarus